Boğazkale ("Gorge Fortress") is a town of Çorum Province in the Black Sea region of Turkey, located  from the city of Çorum. It is the seat of Boğazkale District. Its population is 1,203 (2022). Formerly known as Boğazköy ("Gorge Village"), Boghaz Keui or Boghazköy, this small town (basically one street of shops) sits in a rural area on the road from Çorum to Yozgat. The mayor is Mesut Ocakli (AKP). The town consists of 4 quarters: Yekbas, Çarşı, Hattusas and Hisar.

Boğazkale is the site of the ancient Hittite city Hattusa and its sanctuary Yazılıkaya. Because of its rich historic and architectural heritage, the town is a member of the Norwich-based European Association of Historic Towns and Regions (EAHTR).

Gallery

References

External links

Bogazkale Homepage

Populated places in Çorum Province
Boğazkale District
Towns in Turkey